The 2012 Barcelona Open Banco Sabadell (also known as the Torneo Godó) was a men's tennis tournament played on outdoor clay courts. It was the 60th edition of the event and it was part of the ATP World Tour 500 series of the 2012 ATP World Tour. It took place at the Real Club de Tenis Barcelona in Barcelona, Catalonia, Spain, from 23 April through 29 April 2010. First-seeded Rafael Nadal won the singles title.

Points

Singles main draw entrants

Seeds

1 Rankings as of April 16, 2012

Other entrants
The following players received wildcards into the main draw:
  Iñigo Cervantes Huegun
  Gerard Granollers
  Filip Krajinović
  Javier Martí
  Rubén Ramírez Hidalgo

The following players received entry from the qualifying draw:
  Aljaž Bedene
  Sergei Bubka
  Federico Delbonis
  Robert Farah
  David Goffin
  Andrey Golubev
  João Sousa

The following players received entry as lucky loser:
  Arnau Brugués-Davi
  Evgeny Donskoy
  Stéphane Robert
  Eduardo Schwank

Withdrawals
  Thomaz Bellucci (abdominal strain injury)
  Tomáš Berdych (right shoulder injury)
  Juan Ignacio Chela (achilles tendon injury)
  Juan Mónaco (ankle injury)
  Radek Štěpánek (stomach virus)

Retirements
  Andreas Beck
  Sergei Bubka
  Kei Nishikori (abdominal injury)

Doubles main draw entrants

Seeds

 Rankings are as of April 16, 2012

Other entrants
The following pairs received wildcards into the doubles main draw:
  Iñigo Cervantes Huegun /  Gerard Granollers
  Daniel Gimeno-Traver /  Albert Montañés

Retirements
  Bob Bryan (viral illness)

Finals

Singles

  Rafael Nadal defeated  David Ferrer 7–6(7–1), 7–5
 It was Nadal's 48th title of his career and the 2nd of the season.

Doubles

  Mariusz Fyrstenberg /  Marcin Matkowski defeated  Marcel Granollers /  Marc López, 2–6, 7–6(9–7), [10–8]

References

External links 
 

    
2012
Barcelona Open Banco Sabadell
2012 in Catalan sport
Barcelona